Recreio dos Bandeirantes (or simply Recreio) is both the name of a beach and neighborhood in the West Zone of Rio de Janeiro, Brazil. It is a recent development, with no skyscrapers, and the area also contains jungles atop rocky cliffs and hills. High waves permit surfing at Recreio Beach and the white sand beach is used by beach volleyball players. It is about 35 km from the Rio de Janeiro city centre, and most of the people living there are middle-class and high middle-class families, who moved in trying to escape the growing violence of both the North and South Zones.

Apocryphally, the neighborhood received the name Recreio dos Bandeirantes, or "Bandeirantes' Leisure" because the company that mapped and hired a real estate agent to sell lots there had that name. Another version says that many of the newcomers were from São Paulo, the city from which the Bandeiras departed in colonial times, and therefore Paulistas are associated with them. Still another version states that Recreio was the first (or last) resting place with fresh water for Bandeirantes traveling between Rio de Janeiro and São Paulo.

Development in the area began in 1959, and only more recently, have well-to-do residents discovered and made Recreio their home. It does not have the hustle and bustle of bohemic Lapa, Copacabana, Leblon, and Ipanema, but there has been an increase in the number of restaurants, pizzerias, bars, private schools and colleges. There are a few , or slums, in the section. However, the Taxas Canal is often polluted by slum residents through trash dumping. Recreio has an organized association of residents who communicate online with tips and news about the neighborhood. They have been able to address the need for the city building a —a road for bicycles—and authorities have been persuaded to build, in the future, two subway stations in the section to facilitate commuting to downtown and the South Side (which would otherwise take about ).

Churches in the area:        

Primeira Igreja Batista do Recreio dos Bandeirantes (Igreja do Recreio) or First Baptist Church of Recreio dos Bandeirantes (Church of Recreio) is a Baptist Church near Avenida das Américas on Rua Helena Manela. The pastor of this church is Pastor Wander Gomes and the church has a little over 6,000 members. The church also has a second campus in Vargem Grande. 

Igreja Presbiteriana do Recreio or Recreio Presbyterian Church is a presbyterian church on Rua Enersto Pinheiro. The pastor of this church is Pastor Daniel Guanaes. 

Neighbourhoods in Rio de Janeiro (city)
Beaches of Rio de Janeiro (city)